South Sound Speedway is a  oval race track with a Figure 8 course, located near Grand Mound and Rochester, Washington. It was first constructed by Dick and Wanda Boness but is now owned by Butch Behn.  It has previously hosted the NASCAR K&N Pro Series West and was owned by Jerry Cope, the uncle of Derrike Cope.

Events 
South Sound Speedway hosts several racing divisions including late model, street stock, Legends, NW baby grand, NW Vintage Modified,  and asphalt sprint cars. In the past it hosted the NASCAR K&N Pro Series West and currently hosts the Northwest Super Late Model Series once or twice a season.

Drivers 
Notable drivers to have raced at South Sound Speedway include, from the K&N Pro Series, Rick Carelli, Ron Eaton, Ron Hornaday Jr., Robert Sprague, Dirk Stephens, Angela Cope, and Amber Cope.

Images

See also 
 List of auto racing tracks in the United States
 Short track motor racing

References

External links 

 Official site
 Racing West

Motorsport venues in Washington (state)
Buildings and structures in Thurston County, Washington
Tourist attractions in Thurston County, Washington
NASCAR tracks